George Marshall "Pup" Phillips (September 24, 1895May 1, 1953) was an American football player and coach.

Early years
George Marshall Phillips was born on September 24, 1895 in Carnesville, Georgia to George Sullivan Phillips and Elizabeth Witaker Hunsinger.

Georgia Tech
Phillips was a prominent center for John Heisman's Georgia Tech Golden Tornado of the Georgia School of Technology. He was thrice selected All-Southern.

1916
He was a starter for the 1916 Georgia Tech team which, as one writer wrote, "seemed to personify Heisman." The season included the 222 to 0 rout of Cumberland. Phillips that year was the first Tech center elected All-Southern.

1917
He was a member of Tech's first national championship team in 1917 which outscored opponents 491 to 17. Phillips received the Hal Nowell trophy for the most efficient play during the season. He left to join the American effort in the First World War as a marine just a week after celebrating the national championship.

1919
Phillips played again in 1919, when he was captain. Dick Jemison selected Phillips first-team All-American.

Coaching career
Phillips coached the University School for Boys (Stone Mountain). His quarterback was Johnny Broadnax.

References

External links

1895 births
1953 deaths
Place of birth missing
Place of death missing
American football centers
Georgia Tech Yellow Jackets football players
High school football coaches in Georgia (U.S. state)
All-American college football players
All-Southern college football players
United States Marine Corps personnel of World War I
People from Carnesville, Georgia
Players of American football from Georgia (U.S. state)